78K is the trademark name of 16- and 8-bit microcontroller family
manufactured by Renesas Electronics, originally developed  by NEC
started in 1986.
The basis of 78K Family is an accumulator-based register-bank CISC architecture.
78K is a single-chip microcontroller, which usually integrates; program ROM, data RAM, serial interfaces, timers,  I/O ports, an A/D converter, an interrupt controller, and a CPU core, on one die.

Its application area is mainly simple mechanical system controls and man-machine interfaces.

Regarding software development tools, C compilers and macro-assemblers are available.
As for development tool hardware, full probing-pod type and debug port type in-circuit emulators,
and flash ROM programmers
are available.

Historically, the family has 11 series with 9 instruction set architectures. As of 2018, 3 instruction set architectures, those are 8-bit 78K0, 8-bit 78K0S, and 16-/8-bit 78K0R, are still promoted for customers' new designs.
But in most of cases, migration to RL78 Family,
which is a successor of 78K0R and almost binary level compatible with 78K0R,
is recommended.

Variants

78K0 Series
 (also known as 78K/0) is a long-running 8-bit single chip microcontroller,
which is the basis of 78K0S and 78K0R Series. It contains 8× 8-bit registers ×4 banks. For 16-bit calculating instructions, it performs ALU operation twice. Each instructions are performed serially without instruction pipelining. It has 16-bit 64K Byte address space. Some variants of 78K0 have affordable and compact type 8-bit R-2R D/A converter, which does not have monotonicity because it is not trimmed for adjustment nor followed by operational amplifier.

In its earlier stage, the Program Memory was one-time PROM (OTP), UV-EPROM, or mask ROM.
But with the times, it became flash memory.

78K0S Series
78K0S Series (also known as 78K/0S) is a low-end version of 78K0.
It has 8× 8-bit registers, but without any banks. In addition, some instructions, such as multiplication and division, are removed from 78K0 instruction set architecture.

78K0R Series
78K0R Series is a 16-bit single-chip microcontroller with 3-stage instruction pipelining.
Its instruction set is similar to 78K0 and covers 16- and 8-bit operations. It has 20-bit 1M Byte address space. 75 instructions out of 80 are identical with that of RL78 Family; its successor.

178K0 Series
178K0 Series (also known as 178K/0) is a successor of NEC's 17K Family 4-bit microcontroller for DTS (Digital Tuning Systems) and remote controls.
It integrates 17K family's peripheral functions with the 78K0 8-bit CPU core on a chip.

178K0S Series
178K0S Series (also known as 178K/0S) is also a successor of 17K Family with the 78K0S CPU core.

78K4 Series
78K4 Series (also known as 78K/4) is a 16-bit single-chip microcontroller with 16 and 8-bit operations.
It has 16× 8-bit registers ×4 banks, which can be also used for 8× 16-bit registers ×4 banks. Some of these registers can be also used as 24-bit extension for addressing modes. It has 24-bit 16M Byte address space. It has microcode-based operations named Macro Service with interrupt functions.

78K7 Series
78K7 Series (also known as 78K/7) is a 32-bit single-chip microcontroller with 32, 16 and 8 bit operations. It has 8× 32-bit registers ×16 banks, which can be also used for 16× 16-bit registers ×16 banks and 16× 8-bit registers ×16 banks. It has microcode-based operations named Macro Service with interrupt functions. It has 24-bit 16M Byte linear address space. It is used for some Quantum Fireball products,
but shortly replaced with V850 Family 32-bit RISC microcontrollers.

78K6 Series
78K6 Series (also known as 78K/6) is a 16-bit single-chip microcontroller. Its life-time was short, and less variants.

78K1 Series
78K1 Series (also known as 78K/1) is an 8-bit single-chip microcontroller. It has 8× 8-bit registers ×4 banks. 78K1 series is targeted for servo controls of videocassette recorders. μPD78148 sub-series integrates 2 operational amplifiers.

78K3 Series
78K3 Series (also known as 78K/3) is a 16-bit single-chip microcontroller with 16 and 8 bit operations. It has 16× 8-bit ×8 banks, which can be also used for 8× 16-bit registers ×8 banks. Its address space is 16-bit 64K Byte. It is developed as high-end series of 78K Family. It has microcode-based operations named Macro Service with interrupt functions.

This series is used for hard disk drives, especially Quantum Fireball Series.
μPD78364 sub-series is used for inverter compressor controls.
It is also used for traction control systems of some cars.

78K2 Series
78K2 Series (also known as 78K/2) is an 8-bit single-chip microcontroller. It has 8× 8-bit registers ×4 banks. It is developed as general purpose series of 78K Family.

Predecessors

87AD Family
87AD Family is an 8-bit single-chip microcontroller. It has 8× 8-bit registers ×4 banks. Its instruction set architecture became the basis of 78K.

17K Family
17K Family is a 4-bit single-chip microcontroller, especially dedicated for DTS (Digital Tuning Systems) and remote controls. It has 2 plane of 128× 4-bit register files, and sophisticated fully orthogonal instruction set. This instruction set is completely different from that of 78K Family.

Table list of 78K Family

See also
RL78
V850
Renesas 740
IEBus

References

External links
Technical documents
Application note: 78K/0 Series Basic (I)  Renesas Electronics
Application note: 78K/0 Series Basics(II)  Renesas Electronics
Application note: 78K/0 Series Basic (III)  Renesas Electronics
Web sites
78K Family  Renesas Electronics
78K Family Software & Tools  Renesas Electronics
CPU of the Day: NEC 78C11 Sample and the 78K family  The CPU Shack MUseum 
TESSERA TECHNOLOGY, Inc.

78K
Renesas microcontrollers